is a Japanese international school in San Vicente, Moravia, San José Province, Costa Rica, in the Greater Metropolitan Area. It is affiliated with the Japanese Embassy in Costa Rica. It is located in Residencial Los Colegios.

In 2003 it had a total of 26 students. The school has a longer school day than schools in the United States and Costa Rica.

History
A predecessor part-time school opened in 1967. The day school opened on October 1, 1974, and a permanent campus opened in 1976.

References

Further reading

By former staff: 
 野中 栄生 (current principal of the 船橋市立古和釜中学校; former principal of the Escuela Japonesa de San José) "サンホセ日本人学校（小規模校）における特色ある教育活動 ―― 魅力ある学校づくり・・・身近な人材の活用を通して ――." Tokyo Gakugei University. p. 206-209.
 小林 洋之 (Chōfu Municipal Fujimidai Elementary School (東京都調布市立富士見台小学校), formerly at the Escuela Japonesa de San José). 自分の思いや考えをもち,豊かに表現できる子の育成 : サンホセ日本人学校における作文指導の工夫(第2章教科指導). 在外教育施設における指導実践記録, Tokyo Gakugei University. 27, 13-16, 2004. See profile at CiNii.

External links
  
  
   
 "私たちの学校では サンホセ日本人学校 PURA VIDA!." Hiratsuka, Kanagawa Schools (平塚市学校) network. 

International schools in Costa Rica
1974 establishments in Costa Rica
Educational institutions established in 1974
San José